Sibur Arena (Russian: Сибур Арена) is a multi-purpose indoor sporting arena that is located in the Petrogradsky District, Saint Petersburg, Russia. The arena can be used for basketball, volleyball, handball, futsal, tennis, and entertainment events. The seating capacity of the arena is 7,120. The arena also has 13 VIP boxes, which can accommodate a total of up to 390 fans.

History
Construction on Sibur Arena began in June 2010, and the arena was officially opened on September 11, 2013. The Russian basketball club BC Spartak Saint Petersburg, used the arena as its home arena, while it was playing in the VTB United League and the 2nd-tier level EuroCup during the 2013–14 season. The Russian basketball club BC Zenit Saint Petersburg, moved into the arena to use it as its home arena for both VTB United League and EuroCup games, for the 2014–15 season.

References

External links
Sibur Arena Website
Spartak Arena 
Panoramic Picture of the Arena's Interior
View of the Arena's Interior from Mid Court

2013 establishments in Russia
Basketball venues in Russia
Sports venues in Saint Petersburg
Indoor arenas in Russia
Music venues in Russia
Sports venues completed in 2013
Tennis venues in Russia
Volleyball venues in Russia